Grey Technology Ltd, which uses the trade mark Gtech, is an independent British company designing and manufacturing cordless home and garden appliances such as vacuum cleaners, floor sweepers, grass trimmers and electric bikes.

The company is based in Worcester, Worcestershire.

History
Gtech was founded by Nick Grey, who had previously worked at vacuum cleaner brand VAX. Working initially from his Worcestershire home, Nick Grey developed the world’s first cordless floor sweeper, the SW01 cordless floor sweeper, in 2002. Since then Gtech have launched more floorcare products such as Multi, Pro and HyLite, as well as an eBike range, a garden range, and even an automated massage bed. Gtech has also designed several products on a 'white-label' basis for other brands.

In November 2012, Grey revealed that Gtech has been subject to several corporate espionage attempts from rival manufacturers.

Founder
Nick Grey (born 12 July 1968) is the British designer and inventor who founded Grey Technology. Grey was born in Spetchley, Worcestershire, and attended Aston Fields Middle School. The Grey family spent three years in Roscommon, Ireland, before resettling in Worcestershire in 1979. Grey studied at Ludlow College. Grey and Gtech are based in Worcestershire.

Grey won the Insider Media Limited award for innovation in 2011. He has been profiled by British newspapers, and has been interviewed in the UK press about issues facing start-ups and his own experiences with Gtech.

Products 
 SW02 and SW22 Cordless Floor Sweepers
 AirRAM and AirRAM K9 Cordless Vacuum Cleaners
 Multi and Multi K9 Cordless Handheld Vacuum Cleaners
 Pro Cordless Bagged Vacuum Cleaner
 HyLite Cordless Bagged Vacuum Cleaner
 Cordless Lawnmower
 Cordless Grass Trimmer
 Cordless Hedge Trimmer
 Cordless Leaf Blower
 Cordless Work Light
 Electric Bikes
 Massage Bed

Media coverage and awards
Gtech's cordless vacuum, the AirRAM, has been reviewed in The Daily Telegraph, The Sunday Times, and Which?. In addition, the Good Housekeeping Institute has approved the AirRAM, and the Gtech-designed Bissell Versus cordless vacuum was a winner in its 2009 VIP (Very Innovative Products) Awards.

Gtech won awards for Excellence in Innovation and Business of the Year at the 2013 Herefordshire and Worcestershire Chamber of Commerce Business Awards.

References

External links
Gtech official UK website

Manufacturing companies established in 2001
Home appliance manufacturers of the United Kingdom
Vacuum cleaner manufacturers
British brands
Companies based in Worcestershire
British companies established in 2000